Thristan Mendoza (born 1989) is a Filipino autistic savant and marimba prodigy.

Thristan "Tum-Tum" Mendoza was born 1989 in Quezon City, Philippines. He was enrolled at the Philippine Montessori Center and was diagnosed as autistic at the age of two and a half. During the same year, he began to play.

In 1997 the University of the Philippines presented him as a gifted child prodigy.

He is now a college student majoring in percussion.

He has three siblings (Rainier, Victoria Angela, Victorina Francesca)

References

Further reading
 

1989 births
Autistic savants
Filipino musicians
Living people
Marimbists
Musicians from Metro Manila
People from Quezon City
People on the autism spectrum